This is a list of series released by or aired on TVB Jade Channel in 2002.

Top ten drama series in ratings
The following is a list of the highest-rated drama series released by TVB in 2002. The list includes premiere week and final week ratings.

First line series
These dramas aired in Hong Kong from 7:30 to 8:30 pm (8:00 to 9:00 pm from 10 July onwards), Monday to Friday on TVB.

Second line series
These dramas aired in Hong Kong from 9:30 to 10:30 pm, Monday to Friday on TVB.

Third line series
These dramas aired in Hong Kong from 10:05 to 11:05 pm (9:30 to 10:30 pm from 5 May onwards), Monday to Friday on TVB.

Warehoused series
These dramas were released overseas and have not broadcast on TVB Jade Channel.

External links
TVB.com Official Website 

TVB dramas
2002 in Hong Kong television